Death Alley is a studio album by the hardcore punk band Zeke. It was released in 2001 on Aces and Eights Records.

"Death Alley," the last song on the album, is used in the game Tony Hawk's Pro Skater 4.

"Evil Woman" quotes "High Priest Of Rhythmic Noise," by Cheap Trick.

Critical reception
Exclaim! wrote: "Zeke strike back yet again with their super-aggressive Motörhead/Dwarves-influenced spazz punk, and this time there's an even sharper focus on the metallic 'thunder stick' work." The Stranger called the album "a steely masterpiece."

Track listing

References

2001 albums
Zeke (band) albums